Huang Chia-chi (born 26 January 1979) is a Taiwanese badminton player who competed for the Chinese Taipei at the 1996 and 2000 Summer Olympics. Huang later represented Australia in the international tournament, and competed at the 2010 Commonwealth Games. She has won the New Zealand Open and Australian Open in 2004 and 2006. Huang was awarded as the Sportswomen of the Year by the Badminton Victoria in 2006 and 2007. Her sister Huang Chia-hsin is also a badminton player.

Achievements

Oceania Championships 
Women's singles

Asian Junior Championships 
Girls' singles

BWF Grand Prix (2 titles) 
The BWF Grand Prix had two levels, the BWF Grand Prix and Grand Prix Gold. It was a series of badminton tournaments sanctioned by the Badminton World Federation (BWF) which was held from 2007 to 2017.

Women's singles

Women's doubles

  BWF Grand Prix Gold tournament
  BWF Grand Prix tournament

BWF International Challenge/Series (9 titles, 4 runners-up) 
Women's singles

  BWF International Challenge tournament
  BWF International Series tournament
  BWF Future Series tournament

References

External links 
 
 

1979 births
Living people
Sportspeople from Taipei
Australian people of Taiwanese descent
Taiwanese female badminton players
Australian female badminton players
Olympic badminton players of Taiwan
Badminton players at the 1996 Summer Olympics
Badminton players at the 2000 Summer Olympics
Asian Games competitors for Chinese Taipei
Badminton players at the 2002 Asian Games
Badminton players at the 1998 Asian Games
Commonwealth Games competitors for Australia
Badminton players at the 2010 Commonwealth Games
20th-century Taiwanese women
21st-century Taiwanese women